The St. Elizabeth's flood of 1421 was a flooding of the Grote Hollandse Waard, an area in what is now the Netherlands. It takes its name from the feast day of Saint Elisabeth of Hungary which was formerly 19 November.
It ranks 20th on the list of worst floods in history.
During the night of 18/19 November 1421 a heavy storm near the North Sea coast caused the dikes to break in a number of places and the lower-lying polder land was flooded. A number of villages were swallowed by the flood and were lost, causing between 2,000 and 10,000 casualties. The dike breaks and floods caused widespread devastation in Zeeland and Holland.

The outcome
This flood separated the cities of Geertruidenberg and Dordrecht which had previously fought against each other during the Hook and Cod (civil) wars.
Most of the land remains flooded even since that day.

Reclaimed parts
Most of the area remained flooded for several decades. Reclaimed parts are the island of Dordrecht, the Hoeksche Waard island, and north-western North Brabant (around Geertruidenberg). Most of the Biesbosch (a big area of nature in the Netherlands) area has been flooded since.

Cause of the flood
The cause of the flood was a powerful extratropical cyclone. Water from the storm in the North Sea surged up the rivers causing the dikes to overflow and break through. The flood reached a large sea arm between south Holland and Zeeland (or Zealand), destroying the Grote Hollandse Waard. At the lower point where the flood water reached the city of Dordrecht is the point where flood water still remains today.

See also
St. Elizabeth's flood (1404)
Hook and Cod wars – dispute between Geertruidenberg and Dordrecht
List of floods in the Netherlands
Kinderdijk
Lists of disasters

References

External links

Deltawerken.com recounting 
Rijksmuseum brief description 
indyposted.com 

Floods in the Netherlands
15th-century floods
15th century in the Netherlands
15th-century meteorology
European windstorms
Storm tides of the North Sea
1421 in Europe 
Holland
History of North Brabant
History of South Holland
History of Zeeland
History of Dordrecht
Medieval weather events
Events in Dordrecht